Ahn Hye-jin (born July 23, 1995), known professionally by her stage name Hwasa, is a South Korean singer, rapper, and television personality currently signed to RBW. She debuted as a member of the girl group Mamamoo in 2014. She made her debut as a solo artist in February 2019, with the digital single "Twit".

Early life
Ahn Hye-jin was born on July 23, 1995, in Jeonju, Jeollabuk-do, South Korea, where she lived with her parents and two elder sisters. She graduated from Wonkwang Information Arts High School. Hwasa often cites Beyoncé as her music inspiration, stating that after hearing someone say that she was unique and good at singing but was fat and not pretty, she went home and watched videos of Beyoncé performing all night to comfort herself.

Even before her K-pop debut, a number of South Korean artists – including artist Solbi and the band Standing Egg – recognized her talent and featured her on their tracks when she was 18.

Career

2014–2019: Debut with Mamamoo and launch of solo career

Hwasa debuted as a member of the girl group Mamamoo on June 19, 2014, being one of the leading voices with the release of the lead single "Mr. Ambiguous" from their first extended play (EP) Hello. She wrote and composed her first solo song, "My Heart/I Do Me", from Hello.

In March 2018, Hwasa released her second solo song, "Be Calm", as part of Mamamoo's sixth EP, Yellow Flower. The music video for the song was uploaded on March 25, 2018 and has gained 7.9 million views as of August 2022. "Be Calm" charted at number 35 on the Gaon Download Chart. In April 2018, Hwasa joined the cast of KBS reality television show Hyena on the Keyboard; the appearance spawned a collaboration with rapper Loco titled "Don't". Hwasa took part in writing and composing the song and it topped the South Korean's Gaon Digital Chart. "Don't" was later certified Platinum for 100 million streams in January 2019 and again for 2.5 million downloads in August 2019.

In February 2019, Hwasa made her debut as a solo artist with the digital single, "Twit," which she participated in writing and composing. The song was a commercial success, peaking atop the Gaon Digital Chart and scored a "Triple Crown," topping the Gaon Digital, Gaon Download and Gaon Streaming charts. "Twit" also peaked at number three on Billboard World Digital Song Sales chart for the week of March 2, 2019. Hwasa released the single "In The Fall," a collaboration with South Korean hip-hop producer Woogie, in October. In December, "Twit" was featured in Billboard "The 25 Best K-pop Songs of 2019: Critics' Pick" list at number 8 and in Refinery29s list of "The Best K-Pop Songs of 2019" at number 13. Its music video was also included in Rolling Stone India's article of the "10 Best K-pop Music Videos of 2019".

2020–present: María and continued solo success 

In March 2020, Hwasa collaborated with the English singer Dua Lipa for a remix of Lipa's "Physical," which features Korean lyrics. In April, it was reported that Hwasa had joined the original soundtrack lineup of the Korean drama The King: Eternal Monarch and would be releasing her first solo soundtrack song, titled "Orbit." The song debuted at number 16 on Billboard World Digital Song Sales Chart on May 2, 2020.

On June 29, Hwasa released her debut EP, titled Maria, and the lead single of the same name. The EP debuted at number seven on the Billboard World Albums chart and peaked at number eighty-one on the Billboard Top Current Albums Sales charts on July 11, 2020. Lead single "Maria" was composed by Hwasa and producer Park Woo-sang with the goal of showing her growth as a singer-songwriter. Hwasa also wrote the lyrics for "LMM" and composed "Why." For the week of September 26, 2020, "Maria" peaked at number two on Billboard K-pop Hot 100 and on the week of October 3, 2020, it peaked at number 79 on Billboard Japan Hot 100. "Maria" also debuted at number six on the Billboard World Digital Song Sales chart.

On season six of JTBC's entertainment show Hidden Singer, Hwasa was one of the contestants for the episode airing on September 11, 2020. In the final round, Hwasa won by an overwhelming 79 votes, which ended the four consecutive losing streaks from previous contestants and earned the singer her second win as an original singer of the season. Hwasa joined the cast of MBC reality-variety show How Do You Play? On October 10, she debuted with Refund Sisters, the project supergroup created through Hangout with Yoo. The group released their debut single, "Don't Touch Me." "Don't Touch Me" peaked atop the Gaon Digital Chart for two consecutive weeks.

At the end of 2020, Billboard named "Maria" the song with the second-most weeks inside the K-pop Hot 100 top 10 during the course of the year—charting for 19 consecutive weeks, while Spotify ranked Hwasa number 4 in their "2020 Most Played Female Korean K-pop Artist" list. "Maria" was ranked 2nd in Rolling Stone Indias list of 20 Best K-pop Music Videos of the year and 27th in Papers list of best K-pop song list of 40 Best K-pop Songs of 2020. The article mentioned that "Hwasa is known to many as a fearless person but her single 'Maria' deconstructs that image, casting an image of a young woman who is at once vulnerable and confident, playful and seductive — idol and human." In Time magazine's article documenting K-pop songs and albums that defined the year, the publication wrote "of the solo releases [the] year, Hwasa's "Maria" leaves the most searing impression". With her success, Hwasa ranked ninth on the "Top 100 Kpop Idols YouTube Worldwide Search Rankings for 2020." 

On July 23, 2021, Hwasa launched her YouTube channel, "Hwasa Official" and posted her first video. On November 24, she released her single album Guilty Pleasure, and its lead single "I'm a B". On July 16, 2022, it was announced that Hwasa will collaborate on a new single "Somebody" with Loco, which will be released on July 25.

Impact and influence 

Hwasa has appeared on Korea Power Celebrity 40 list placing 26th in 2019, and was featured by Forbes in their 30 Under 30 Asia list of 2021. She was ranked as the 16th most popular K-pop idol in 2018 and 9th in 2019 in annual surveys conducted by Gallup Korea. Also, she was ranked 9th in annual survey for Gallup Korea's Singer of the Year in 2020 under the category selected by respondents in age group 13 to 39. She also has been placed first occasionally on the Korean Business Research Institute's monthly "Individual Girl Group Members Brand Power Ranking".

Hwasa's appearances on reality shows, I Live Alone and Let's Eat Dinner Together, has been credited for influencing restaurant habits, food recipes and increased sales of foods and accessories in South Korea.

Endorsements 
In September 2018, Hwasa was selected as an ambassador for outdoor brand The North Face. In October 2018, she became the first female model for Lotte Crunky Gold since its release in 1984. In March 2019, Hwasa became an endorser for Davich's 'Trevues' lenses. In March 2019, Coca-Cola ice tea brand Gold Peak Tea selected Hwasa as their new model. She then became the newest muse for make up brand Rarekind in April 2019. In June 2019, Hwasa became the new model for Everland Caribbean Bay. Hwasa later on was featured on the cover of Cosmopolitan Korea's August 2019 issue. In November, she teamed up with Vogue magazine and Urban Decay cosmetics for their "Pretty Different" and "Queen" inspired concepts. Ottogi revealed in November 2019 that their newest model for their Jjamppong instant noodles was Hwasa.

In January 2020, The Sims 4 announced that Hwasa will be part of their advertising campaign. EA Korea released "Play With Life," a Sims 4 commercial film video featuring Hwasa. She then teamed up with MCM for the February issue of Elle Korea, a fashion magazine. In February of that year, Hwasa was chosen as an ambassador for sports brand Adidas. Hwasa later on became Kiss New York's new muse in April, and the following month, she was chosen as a model for a hangover drink by Lotte Chilsung Beverage. Hwasa was featured on the cover of Cosmopolitan Korea's August 2020 issue. Tommy Jeans released a campaign pictorial with Hwasa on September 16 for the 2020 Fall Season. In September, Vogue and Gucci had a collaboration campaign from the idea of having time with themselves. In 2021, Hwasa was featured in Vogue's February 2021 issue.

In September 2022, Hwasa together with EXO's Kai became brand ambassadors for the South Korean health and beauty brand, Olive Young. The duo's nationwide campaign started on September 15th as featured on the company's social media.

Discography 

Extended plays
 María (2021)

Filmography

Television series

Television shows

Web shows

Radio show

Host

Awards and nominations

Notes

References

External links

1995 births
Living people
People from Jeonju
K-pop singers
South Korean women pop singers
South Korean women rappers
South Korean female idols
South Korean jazz singers
21st-century South Korean women singers
Mamamoo members
Sunheung An clan